Drew Pavlou Democratic Alliance (DPDA), also known as Democratic Alliance, is an Australian political party founded in 2021. The party was registered with the Australian Electoral Commission on 28 February 2022.

The party's policies include promoting a pro-Taiwan foreign policy, protecting human rights, establishing a federal anti-corruption agency, building a green economy, and supporting workplace democracy. The party ran in the 2022 Australian federal election but failed to win a seat after having only won 0.02% of the first preference votes.

Candidates in the 2022 Australian federal election

House of Representatives

Senate

See also 

 List of political parties in Australia

References 

Political parties in Australia
Political parties established in 2022
2022 establishments in Australia